Ray Walker (born 18 December 1941) is a former Australian rules footballer who played in the Victorian Football League (VFL).

Walker played with Footscray as a back pocket. He was an excellent mark with a good football brain.

Walker played 72 games for Footscray (1959–65), won the Walker won Footscray's 1963 best and fairest award and was selected to represent Victoria.

In 1966 Walker moved to Tasmania to pursue coaching.  He was a premiership captain coach during his six years in Tasmania.

From 1972 to 1987 Walker worked as a commentator for Channel 9 and on ABC Radio.

His football credentials include five years (1981–85) as a VFL state selector and three years as chairman of selectors for the Footscray Football Club. Walker was awarded life membership of the club in 1999.

Walker is a current Bulldogs hall of fame selector.

Walker is the uncle of current AFL Women's (AFLW) player Lauren Arnell

References

External links
Photo as Tasmanian state representative, 1966

1941 births
Living people
Western Bulldogs players
Charles Sutton Medal winners
Australian rules footballers from Victoria (Australia)
Burnie Football Club players
Penguin Football Club players
Braybrook Football Club players